Prachanda Putanigalu is a 1981 Indian Kannada film, directed by Geethapriya and produced by M. K. Balaji Singh. The film stars Master Ramakrishna Hegde, Master Bhanuprakash, Baby Indira and Master Naveen in lead roles. The film had musical score by Upendra Kumar. The film was remade by the director in 1982 in Hindi as Anmol Sitaare.

Cast

 Tiger Prabhakar as Nanjunda
 Master Ramakrishna Hegde as Ramu
 Master Bhanuprakash as Setu
 Baby Indira
 Master Naveen
 Sundar Krishna Urs SP Subhash Kulkarni
 Srilalitha
 Sadashiva Brahmavar
 Dinesh Railway Guard
 Shivaram
 Musuri Krishnamurthy as Police Constable 244
 Sudheer as Shambhu
 Prabhakar as Rudra
 Dwarakish as Himself
 Thoogudeepa Srinivas as Shankar
 Jr Narasimharaju
 Dingri Nagaraj
 Guggu

Soundtrack

Reception

References

External links
 

1980s Kannada-language films
Films scored by Upendra Kumar
Indian children's films
Kannada films remade in other languages
Films directed by Geethapriya